Dogfeiling was a minor sub-kingdom and later a commote in north Wales.

It formed part of the eastern border of the Kingdom of Gwynedd in early medieval Wales. The area was named for Dogfael, one of the sons of the first King of Gwynedd, Cunedda. It existed from 445 until sometime around the year 700 when it was re-absorbed back into Gwynedd proper.

References 

Commotes
Kingdoms of Wales
445 establishments
States and territories established in the 440s
States and territories disestablished in the 8th century